The United States Amateur Hockey Association (USAHA) was an ice hockey governing body in the United States from 1920 to 1925, which operated at an amateur level. The league was filled with predominantly Canadian-born players, but struggled to achieve consistent attendance figures in the days before large arenas with artificial ice. The association disbanded in 1925, with some teams eventually joining the American Hockey Association, and one team joining the National Hockey League.

History

The United States Amateur Hockey Association (USAHA) was founded on October 25, 1920 in Philadelphia. The International Skating Union of America which had governed ice hockey until then, resolved to turn over control of the sport with the approval of the Amateur Athletic Union (AAU). The USAHA also inherited the existing affiliation agreement with the Canadian Amateur Hockey Association (CAHA), which allowed teams from the USAHA to play against teams in either the AAU or the CAHA.

William Samuel Haddock from Pittsburgh was elected the first president of the USAHA. The original eight teams in the USAHA included the Pittsburgh Yellow Jackets, and teams from Boston, Cleveland, New York City, Philadelphia, and three from Minnesota including Duluth, Eveleth, and Saint Paul. Later additions were the Boston Athletic Association, the Fort Pitt Hornets, Milwaukee, Minneapolis, and three transfers from the American Amateur Hockey Association which included teams from Calumet, Houghton and Sault Ste. Marie, Michigan. The USAHA divided its team into three divisions for the first two seasons, with teams grouped in the east, the mid-west and northwest. From 1922 onward, the association was grouped into eastern and western divisions.

In 1922, an annual post-season series was arranged for the USAHA champion to play the senior hockey champion of the CAHA for the Hamilton B. Wills Trophy, but no such series was played for various reasons. In 1923, the USAHA and the CAHA negotiated an agreement to govern the migration of senior hockey players between the associations. Persistent disagreements on player movements between the USAHA and the CAHA, led to CAHA president Silver Quilty cancelling the agreement in 1925. The USAHA disbanded after the 1924–25 season. The Pittsburgh Yellow Jackets joined the National Hockey League, and the western teams were reorganized as the Central Hockey League in 1925, which later became the American Hockey Association in 1926.

The association had faced difficulties with consistent refereeing, and the lack of suitable ice for the whole season since most teams played on natural outdoor ice surfaces instead of arenas. The Minneapolis Arena, and the Duquesne Gardens in Pittsburgh were the largest rinks at the time. The association also struggled with attendance figures due to the varying arena capacities.

Teams

Boston A.A. (1920–1925)
Boston Hockey Club (1922–1925)
Boston Maples (1923–1925)
Boston Pere Marquette Knights of Columbus (1921–22)
Boston Shoe Trades (1920–21)
Boston Victorias (1922–23)
Boston Westminsters (1921–22)
New Haven Westminsters (1922–1924)
Calumet H/C (1920–1922)
Canadian Soo Greyhounds (1920–1922)
Cleveland Hockey Club (a.k.a. "Indians" or "Blues") (1920–1925)
Duluth Hornets (1920–1925)
Eveleth Reds (1920–1924)
Eveleth Arrowheads (1924–25)
Fort Pitt Hornets (1924–25)
Michigan Soo Wildcats (1920–1922)
Milwaukee AC (1922–23)
Minneapolis Millers (1923–24)
Minneapolis Rockets (1924–25)
New York Canadian Club (1922–23)
New York St. Nicholas (1920–1923)
Philadelphia Quaker City (1920–1922)
Pittsburgh Yellowjackets (1921–1925)
Portage Lakes H/C (1920–1922)
St. Paul Athletic Club/Saints (1920–1925)

Players
USAHA players were predominantly Canadians, with the St. Paul and Duluth teams being the exceptions. Rosters were typically small and ranged from nine to twelve players, and teams did not usually have an alternate goaltender.

Notable players from the USAHA include:

Taffy Abel
Nobby Clark
Lionel Conacher
Anthony Conroy
Vic Desjardins
Herb Drury
Percy Galbraith
Moose Goheen
Magnus Goodman
Ching Johnson
Herbie Lewis
Joseph McCormick
Lawrence McCormick
Mickey McGuire
Hib Milks
Muzz Murray
Herb Rhéaume
Eddie Rodden
Jim Seaborn
Raymie Skilton
Art Somers
Nels Stewart
Tiny Thompson
Vern Turner
Flat Walsh
Cooney Weiland
Frank Winters
Roy Worters

Player gallery

Champions
United States Amateur Hockey Association regular season and playoff champions.

Canadian Soo was ineligible to compete for the U.S. championship, so group runner-up Eveleth entered the playoffs instead.

References

External links
United States Amateur Hockey Association and statistics

 
Defunct ice hockey leagues in the United States
1920 establishments in the United States
1925 disestablishments in the United States
Sports leagues established in 1920
Sports leagues disestablished in 1925